Koharalepis is a prehistoric lobe-finned fish which lived during the Devonian period.

References 

Devonian bony fish
Canowindrids
Prehistoric lobe-finned fish genera